Anna Lynch is an English billiards and snooker player  from Australia who won the World Women's Billiards Championship in 2019. She is also a professional jazz pianist.

Career
Lynch is a professional music teacher, and concert pianist. Whilst she was playing Eight-ball pool at a local pool hall, one of the owners suggested that she get in touch with the Victorian Billiards and Snooker Association. Seven months after taking up snooker, she entered her first tournament, in around 2001.

Lynch won the Victorian Women's Billiard Championship sixteen times between 2003 and 2019, failing to win only in 2014 in this period. She was runner-up in 2002.

She was a semi-finalist at the World Women's Billiards Championship in 2015, losing 274–382 to Revanna Umadevi.

In August 2019, Lynch won the Australian National Women's Billiards Championship. She won all three one-hour matches in her qualifying group, with an average points difference of 116. In the ninety-minute semi-final, she beat Lyndal Ellement 270–195, and in the ninety-minute final, won 255–222 against Caroline Ruscitti. Lynch made the two highest breaks of the tournament, 54 and 34.

Lynch entered the 2019 World Billiards Championship, and was the only woman to compete. She had one win, 232–213 against New Zealand's Zac Guja, during which she made a break of 57. She also had a very close battle with 13 time New South Wales Champion Joe Minici holding the lead for the majority of the match before a crucial break from Joe sealed the match. She unfortunately did not progress from her qualifying group.

At the 2019 World Women's Billiards Championship in October 2019, Lynch won all four of the matches in her qualifying group by convincing margins, aggregating a total of 883 points to 279 for her opponents, for an average difference of 151. The top two players from each group qualified to progress to the semi-finals. In the semi-final, Lynch beat Jennifer Budd 287–155. The final was Lynch's closest match of the tournament. She recorded a 244–204 victory over Judy Dangerfield to win the title.

Titles and achievements

Snooker

Billiards

References

External links 
 Anna Lynch profile at World Billiards
 Anna Lynch vs. Judy Dangerfield 2019 World Women's Billiards Championship Final (YouTube Video)

Australian players of English billiards
Australian snooker players
Female players of English billiards
Female snooker players
Living people
Year of birth missing (living people)